Edwin Donald Macon (March 7, 1927 – April 19, 2017) was a professional American football halfback.

Early life
Macon was a track star at Edison High School. He was drafted into the United States Army during World War II in 1945, and was stationed for seven months at Yokohama, Japan, after the war's conclusion. Upon returning to the United States, he joined the San Joaquin Delta College track team, before transferring to Pacific. Macon was convinced by Pacific coach Larry Siemering to join the school's football team, becoming the first black Tigers player. In three seasons with the Tigers, Macon scored 34 touchdowns, and went 24–8–1.

Professional career
Macon was drafted in the second round (twentieth selection) of the 1952 NFL Draft by the Chicago Bears and became the first African-American player on the team; he spent two years as a halfback and return specialist. He was the second African-American to be drafted by the Bears; the first, George Taliaferro, was drafted by them in 1949, but chose to play in the All-America Football Conference. With the Bears, Macon rushed for 324 yards and two touchdowns on 70 attempts while catching 14 passes for 49 yards and two touchdowns. On 22 kick returns, he averaged 30.5 yards per return and 5.9 yards on 24 punt returns. He left the Bears in 1954 to play for the Calgary Stampeders of the Canadian Football League. Bears coach and owner George Halas was not pleased about his departure, blackballing Macon and suing him for $100,000. As a result, the Bears refused to acknowledge Macon being on the team. After being out of football for two years, which he spent as a longshoreman, Macon joined the Hamilton Tiger-Cats in 1957 before leaving in 1959 to resume his longshoreman career, but later joined the Oakland Raiders of the American Football League in 1960. With the Raiders, Macon was converted to defensive back, and was tied for second in the league with nine interceptions, which earned him All-AFL honors.

Personal life
Macon and his wife (of 70 years) Jessie, had four daughters, Edna Rice (Bertram), Marilyn Gayles (Percy), Janice Macon and Andrea Terry (McClellan), as well as a son, Edwin Macon Jr. Eddie and Jessie married in 1945 and resided in Stockton, CA. They relocated to the Bay Area before returning to Stockton to live out their life in a senior living residence as of October 2012.

Upon retiring, Macon worked for over 40 years as a longshoreman, retiring at the age of 86 years old. He died on April 19, 2017, at the age of 90.

References

1927 births
2017 deaths
American football halfbacks
American players of Canadian football
American football return specialists
American football defensive backs
Pacific Tigers football players
Chicago Bears players
Calgary Stampeders players
Hamilton Tiger-Cats players
Oakland Raiders players
Players of American football from Stockton, California
Players of Canadian football from Stockton, California
United States Army personnel of World War II
African-American players of American football
United States Army soldiers
20th-century African-American sportspeople
21st-century African-American people